Mutaya Mwape (born 19 June 1996) is a Zambian professional footballer who plays as a midfielder for Chattanooga FC in NISA.

Club career

College and amateur 
Mwape played two years of college soccer at Lindsey Wilson College between 2016 and 2017, where he scored 25 goals and tallied 19 assists in 34 appearances for the Blue Raiders.

While at college, Mwape also appeared for Premier Development League sides Ocean City Nor'easters and Charlotte Eagles. While with the Nor'easters in 2016, he helped the team win the Eastern Conference championship, while playing in every game during that playoff run. He scored two goals and dished out two assists before Ocean City fell short in the PDL Semifinals. The following year, Mwape joined the Eagles where he helped the club win the first PDL championship in team history.

Professional 
On 1 March 2018, Mwape signed for United Soccer League side Charlotte Independence. He left Charlotte at the end of their 2018 season.

On 21 January 2019, Mwape joined the Richmond Kickers ahead of the first USL League One season.

Mwape joined South Georgia Tormenta on August 25, 2022. He made three appearances in the season, and had his contract option declined.

On 28 December 2022, Mwape signed with Chattanooga FC of NISA.

References

External links 
 
 

1996 births
Living people
Zambian footballers
Zambian expatriate footballers
Zambian expatriate sportspeople in the United States
Association football midfielders
Charlotte Eagles players
Charlotte Independence players
Expatriate soccer players in the United States
Lindsey Wilson Blue Raiders men's soccer players
Ocean City Nor'easters players
Sportspeople from Lusaka
Richmond Kickers players
Soccer players from Massachusetts
USL Championship players
USL League One players
USL League Two players
Tormenta FC 2 players
Tormenta FC players